"Dixie Road" is a song written by Don Goodman, Pam Rose and Mary Ann Kennedy. It was first recorded by Leslie Utter (https://www.discogs.com/release/6780675-Leslie-Utter-Dixie-Road) in 1979. The King Henry version got to number 48 on the Hot Country Songs charts.

It was later recorded by American country music artist Lee Greenwood.  It was released in March 1985 as the first single from his Greatest Hits compilation album.  Greenwood's version was his third number one on the country chart.  The single went to number one for one week and spent a total of fourteen weeks on the country chart.

Charts

Weekly charts

Year-end charts

References

1985 singles
Lee Greenwood songs
Songs written by Mary Ann Kennedy (American singer)
Songs written by Pam Rose
MCA Records singles
Songs written by Don Goodman (songwriter)
Song recordings produced by Jerry Crutchfield
1979 songs